Events from the year 1703 in Sweden

Incumbents
 Monarch – Charles XII

Events

 19 March - Swedish victory at the Battle of Saladen.
 21 April - Swedish victory at the Battle of Pułtusk (1703).
 July 19 - Russian victory at the Battle of Systerbäck.

 
 
 
 The Charles XII Bible is completed.

Births

 23 March - Cajsa Warg cookery book author  (died 1769)

Deaths

 16 January - Erik Dahlbergh, engineer, soldier, and field marshal (born 1625)
 unknown - Maria Skytte, notorious baroness (born 1630s)

References

External links

 
Years of the 18th century in Sweden
Sweden